Jordan Matthews (born 1984) is an American lawyer known for handling several cases against Wynn Las Vegas and Steve Wynn.

Early life and education
Matthews was born in Pittsburgh, Pennsylvania, and attended Community Day School with Bari Weiss. He was discovered by Stella Adler's grandson, Tom Oppenheim.

Career

Steve Wynn Lawsuits 
In 2018, Matthews filed suit against Wynn Las Vegas and Steve Wynn on behalf of Angelica Limcaco, a former salon manager at Wynn Las Vegas. Limcaco claimed that she was fired, blacklisted and intimidated into silence after she elevated her concerns about sexual assault in 2006 to then-president of Wynn Las Vegas, Andrew Pascal. The federal case followed a report by the Wall Street Journal in January 2018 that uncovered allegations of sexual misconduct against Steve Wynn. The allegations revealed that Steve Wynn entered into a confidential $7.5 million settlement with a manicurist in 2005, who reported that she had been raped and impregnated by Steve Wynn. Limcaco was the salon manager who reported the rape allegation to human resources, but was threatened to remain silent about the incident.

Limcaco's case was appealed to the 9th U.S. Circuit Court of Appeals after Judge Miranda Du ruled in favor of Wynn Las Vegas holding that the claim was not made within the statute of limitations. Matthews argued that the time limits should not apply because Limcaco feared for her personal safety. Matthews filed a petition with the Ninth Circuit in March 2020 questioning the Nevada District Court's selection of Elayna Youchah, an attorney for Wynn Resorts, as a magistrate judge.

Limcaco filed a civil RICO claim against Steve Wynn, Matthew Maddox, Barbara Buckley and others in California in 2020 related to Wynn's casino licenses with Encore Boston Harbor and a probe by the Massachusetts Gaming Commission. The RICO case made allegations of bribery and alleged incidents tied to the Sicilian Mafia in Boston. The case is currently on appeal with the Ninth Circuit of the United States Court of Appeals. The RICO case alleges a pattern of influence and is tied to former Wynn Resorts executive, Gamal Aziz, being found guilty of honest services fraud in the 2019 college admissions bribery scandal. The indictment of Elliott Broidy for his involvement in the 1MDB scandal is also tied to the case. In April 2020, the Ninth Circuit denied a motion by Wynn attempting to dismiss the appeal.

In May 2022, the United States Department of Justice filed a civil lawsuit against Steve Wynn for allegedly violating the Foreign Agents Registration Act. Wynn is accused of attempting to improperly influence Donald Trump to extradite Chinese dissident Guo Wengui. Wynn is accused of taking these steps on behalf of the Chinese government to protect his business interests in China. Matthews filed a new brief in the Ninth Circuit RICO case that cited the Department of Justice's lawsuit and alleged that Wynn engaged in a "pattern of improper influence to protect business interests in the gaming industry.". In July 2022, Sun Lijun, China's ex-public security minister (who was the alleged point-of-contact for Steve Wynn in the alleged effort to influence the Trump Administration) pled guilty to accepting about $96.3 million in bribes related to selling government positions.

Bell-Carter Lawsuit 
In March 2020, Matthews filed an anti-trust lawsuit against Bell-Carter Foods and DCOOP Group of Spain, the world's largest cooperative of olive growers, related to the Trump administration's trade tariffs against Spanish imports.

Deja Riley Lawsuit 
In April, 2021, Matthews filed suit against Teddy Riley's daughter, Deja Riley, a fitness celebrity.

Film 
Matthews was previously an actor and starred in the movie Fading of the Cries with Brad Dourif and Thomas Ian Nicholas. The movie also starred Mackenzie Rosman from 7th Heaven. The film was released by Lionsgate and was panned by critics.

In 2009, The Hollywood Reporter announced that he was set to star opposite Elaine Hendrix in Brian A. Metcalf's movie "Eve".

In 2012, Matthews was linked to a film fund backing a mini-series from Walter Isaacson's book "Benjamin Franklin: An American Life." Alec Baldwin was set to star and the series never got made, but was revealed in soap star Katherine Kelly Lang's divorce.

Matthews' companies were linked to film financing deals with several movie studios, including Ryan Kavanaugh's Relativity Media.

Author 
Matthews is the author of the book "Failure: When You Have Nothing You Have Everything."

References

1984 births
Living people
20th-century American lawyers
21st-century American lawyers
American male film actors
Lawyers from Pittsburgh